David Manuel Mosquera Lendoiro ( in Betanzos), also known as Petón, is a Spanish marathon canoe racer. He has won a bronze medal at the 2011 World Championships and another bronze medal at the 2014 Canoe Marathon European Championships, in both cases in the C-1 event.

References

1978 births
Spanish male canoeists
Living people
People from Betanzos
Sportspeople from the Province of A Coruña